The men's beach volleyball tournament at the 2018 Commonwealth Games was be held on the Gold Coast, Australia from April 6 to 12. The beach volleyball competition was held at Coolangatta Beachfront. This was the first time that beach volleyball was held at the Commonwealth Games. A total of twelve men's teams competed (24 athletes, at 2 per team).

Competition schedule
The following is the competition schedule for the men's tournament:

Qualification
A total of 12 men's teams qualified to compete at the games.

Medalists

Pools composition
The 12 teams would be split into three groups of four, with the top two teams in each group along with the two best third place teams advancing to the knockout round. Canada was the top ranked nation, followed by Australia, England and New Zealand. These four were placed in the three pools in a snake pattern. The remaining eight teams were randomly drawn among the other three pools.

Preliminary round
All times are AEST (UTC−10:00).

Pool A

Pool B

Pool C

Knockout round

Quarterfinals

Semifinals

Bronze medal match

Gold medal match

References

men's